The 1990–91 QMJHL season was the 22nd season in the history of the Quebec Major Junior Hockey League. The league inaugurates the St-Clair Group Plaque, awarded to the "Marketing Director of the Year." Dilio and Lebel divisions are restored as the league adds an expansion franchise in Beauport, Quebec, a suburb of the provincial capital. Twelve teams played 70 games each in the schedule.

The Chicoutimi Saguenéens finished first overall in the regular season, winning their first Jean Rougeau Trophy, backstopped by Goaltender of the Year and Playoff MVP, Felix Potvin. Chicoutimi won its first President's Cup, defeating the Drummondville Voltigeurs in four games.

Team changes
 The Beauport Harfangs join the league as an expansion franchise.

Final standings
Note: GP = Games played; W = Wins; L = Losses; T = Ties; Pts = Points; GF = Goals for; GA = Goals against

complete list of standings.

Scoring leaders
Note: GP = Games played; G = Goals; A = Assists; Pts = Points; PIM = Penalties in Minutes

 complete scoring statistics

Playoffs
Steve Larouche was the leading scorer of the playoffs with 33 points (13 goals, 20 assists).

All-star teams
First team
 Goaltender - Felix Potvin, Chicoutimi Saguenéens
 Left defence - Eric Brule, Chicoutimi Saguenéens  
 Right defence - Patrice Brisebois, Drummondville Voltigeurs
 Left winger - Todd Gillingham, Trois-Rivières Draveurs  
 Centreman - Yanic Perreault, Trois-Rivières Draveurs 
 Right winger - Robert Guillet, Longueuil Collège Français     
 Coach - Jos Canale, Chicoutimi Saguenéens

Second team
 Goaltender - Boris Rousson, Granby Bisons   
 Left defence - Guy Lehoux, Drummondville Voltigeurs   
 Right defence - Philippe Boucher, Granby Bisons 
 Left winger - Pierre Sevigny, Saint-Hyacinthe Laser 
 Centreman - Denis Chalifoux, Laval Titan
 Right winger - Martin Lapointe, Laval Titan
 Coach - Alain Vigneault, Hull Olympiques

Rookie team
 Goaltender - Marcel Cousineau, Beauport Harfangs
 Left defence - Martin Lapage, Hull Olympiques 
 Right defence - Dean Melanson, Saint-Hyacinthe Laser
 Left winger - Rene Corbet, Drummondville Voltigeurs  
 Centreman - Pierre-Francois Lalonde, Hull Olympiques
 Right winger - Martin Gendron, Saint-Hyacinthe Laser
 Coach - Jean Hamel, Drummondville Voltigeurs
 List of First/Second/Rookie team all-stars.

Trophies and awards
Team
President's Cup - Playoff Champions, Chicoutimi Saguenéens
Jean Rougeau Trophy - Regular Season Champions, Chicoutimi Saguenéens
Robert Lebel Trophy - Team with best GAA, Chicoutimi Saguenéens

Player
Michel Brière Memorial Trophy - Most Valuable Player, Yanic Perreault, Trois-Rivières Draveurs
Jean Béliveau Trophy - Top Scorer, Yanic Perreault, Trois-Rivières Draveurs  
Guy Lafleur Trophy - Playoff MVP, Felix Potvin, Chicoutimi Saguenéens
Shell Cup – Offensive - Offensive Player of the Year, Yanic Perreault, Trois-Rivières Draveurs  
Shell Cup – Defensive - Defensive Player of the Year, Felix Potvin, Chicoutimi Saguenéens
Transamerica Plaque - Best plus/minus total, Christian Larivière, Saint-Hyacinthe Laser 
Jacques Plante Memorial Trophy - Best GAA, Felix Potvin, Chicoutimi Saguenéens
Emile Bouchard Trophy - Defenceman of the Year, Patrice Brisebois, Drummondville Voltigeurs 
Mike Bossy Trophy - Best Pro Prospect, Philippe Boucher, Granby Bisons 
Michel Bergeron Trophy - Offensive Rookie of the Year, Rene Corbet, Drummondville Voltigeurs
Raymond Lagacé Trophy - Defensive Rookie of the Year, Philippe Boucher, Granby Bisons
Frank J. Selke Memorial Trophy - Most sportsmanlike player, Yanic Perreault, Trois-Rivières Draveurs
Marcel Robert Trophy - Best Scholastic Player, Benoit Larose, Laval Titan 
Paul Dumont Trophy - Personality of the Year, Patrice Brisebois, Drummondville Voltigeurs

Executive
John Horman Trophy - Executive of the Year, Rolland Janelle, Drummondville Voltigeurs 
St-Clair Group Plaque - Marketing Director of the Year, Gilles Cote, Hull Olympiques

See also
1991 Memorial Cup
1991 NHL Entry Draft
1990–91 OHL season
1990–91 WHL season

References
 Official QMJHL Website
 www.hockeydb.com/

Quebec Major Junior Hockey League seasons
QMJHL